David Cayemitte is a former U.S. soccer player who is now the head of the Cayemitte Group, Inc, an insurance, surety bonding and risk management company.

Soccer
Cayemitte attended Adelphi University where he played on the men’s soccer team from 1982 to 1985.  He graduated with a bachelor’s degree in finance.  While still in college, Cayemitte earned one cap with the U.S. national team when he came on for Eddie Hawkins in a 2-2 tie with Ecuador on  December 2, 1984.

Business career
Cayemitte was hired by American International Group where he spent fourteen years.  He rose through the company to become Vice President of National Union, a subsidiary of AIG.  He then moved to St. Paul Travelers as a Regional Vice President.  He then founded his own company, the Cayemitte Group which provides underwriting and management products to the insurance industry.

References

External links
 Company profile

Living people
American soccer players
Adelphi Panthers men's soccer players
American businesspeople in insurance
American International Group people
United States men's international soccer players
Association football defenders
Year of birth missing (living people)